This is a list of holidays in the Papua New Guinea.

List

References

 
Papua New Guinea
Holidays
Law of Papua New Guinea